Nee Soon East Single Member Constituency was a single member constituency in the northern area of Singapore. The ward consists of Yishun's Neighbourhoods 2, 3 and 4. Formed in 2001 after being carved out from Sembawang Group Representation Constituency, its Member of Parliament was People's Action Party's Ho Peng Kee. In 2011, it was merged into a newly formed Nee Soon GRC. This SMC and Nee Soon Central SMC were formerly under the Sembawang-Nee Soon Town Council, which comprises Sembawang GRC (which has six members with this SMC) and Nee Soon Central SMC from 2001 until 2011.

Member of Parliament

Elections

Elections in the 2000s

See also
Nee Soon Central SMC
Nee Soon South SMC
Nee Soon SMC
Nee Soon GRC

References
2001 GE's result
2006 GE's result

Singaporean electoral divisions
Simpang
Yishun